Jack Donaldson may refer to:
Jack Donaldson, Baron Donaldson of Kingsbridge (1907–1998), British Minister for the Arts 1976–1979
Jack Donaldson (athlete) (1886–1933), Australian sprinter
Jack Donaldson (footballer) (1880–1934), Australian footballer

See also
Donaldson (disambiguation)
John Donaldson (disambiguation)